N-Acetyldopamine is the organic compound with the formula CH3C(O)NHCH2CH2C6H3(OH)2.  It is the N-acetylated derivative of dopamine.  This compound is a reactive intermediate in sclerotization, the process by which insect cuticles are formed by hardening molecular precursors.  The catechol substituent is susceptible to redox and crosslinking.

References

 
Phenethylamines